Edgar A. Long Building is a historic building located on the campus of the former Christiansburg Industrial Institute at Christiansburg, Montgomery County, Virginia.  It was built in 1927, and is a 2 1/2-story, rectangular brick building in the Colonial Revival style  The front facade features an advanced central pavilion with a brick pedimented gable containing a half circular garret vent.  It has a classical cornice and a gabled deck on a hipped roof.  It was constructed following the move from the separately listed Old Christiansburg Industrial Institute.

It was listed on the National Register of Historic Places in 2001.

References

External links
New River Heritage Coalition: Christiansburg Institute

African-American history of Virginia
School buildings on the National Register of Historic Places in Virginia
Colonial Revival architecture in Virginia
University and college buildings completed in 1927
Buildings and structures in Montgomery County, Virginia
National Register of Historic Places in Montgomery County, Virginia